The surname Nehls may refer to:

David Nehls (born 1964), an American actor, performer, musical director, and composer 
Michael Nehls (born 1962), a German doctor of medicine, author, and former cyclist
Troy Nehls (born 1968), American politician